Cynthia Marie Lummis Wiederspahn (born September 10, 1954) is an American attorney and politician serving as the junior United States senator from Wyoming since 2021. A member of the Republican Party, Lummis served as the U.S representative for Wyoming's at-large congressional district from 2009 to 2017. She served in the Wyoming House of Representatives from 1979 to 1983 and from 1985 to 1993, in the Wyoming Senate from 1993 to 1995, and as the Wyoming State Treasurer from 1999 to 2007.

Lummis was elected treasurer of Wyoming in 1998 and reelected without opposition in 2002. She chaired Mary Mead's gubernatorial campaign in 1990 and Ray Hunkins's gubernatorial campaign in 2006. She also served on Bob Dole's presidential steering committee in Wyoming and chaired Mitt Romney's 2012 presidential campaign in Wyoming.

Lummis unsuccessfully sought to be appointed to replace Senator Craig L. Thomas in 2007. She was elected to succeed Barbara Cubin in the U.S. House of Representatives in the 2008 election, defeating Democratic nominee Gary Trauner. During her tenure in the House, she was the first Wyoming representative to serve on the Agriculture Committee since 1941, chaired the Science Subcommittee on Energy, co-chaired the Congressional Caucus for Women's Issues, and was active in the Congressional Western Caucus and Freedom Caucus. She served until her retirement in 2017, and was succeeded by Liz Cheney. After her tenure in the House, Lummis sought a position in President Donald Trump's cabinet as Secretary of the Interior, but was not appointed. She was elected to the U.S. Senate in the 2020 election, becoming the first woman to represent Wyoming in the Senate. She voted to reject the certification of Pennsylvania's electoral votes in the 2020 presidential election, which were narrowly won by Joe Biden.

Early life and education

Cynthia Marie Lummis was born on September 10, 1954, in Cheyenne, Wyoming, to Doran Lummis and Enid Bennett. She is descended from German immigrants and her family first came to Wyoming in 1868. Her father chaired the Laramie County Republican Party and served on the county board of commissioners. Her brother Del Lummis also chaired the Laramie County Republican Party. Lummis attended Cheyenne East High School, and graduated from the University of Wyoming with a Bachelor of Science degree in animal science in 1976 and a Bachelor of Science in biology in 1978. She graduated from the University of Wyoming with a Juris Doctor in 1985, and was on the dean's list. She worked as a student teacher at Rock River School in 1977.

Career

State legislature

Elections

In 1978, Lummis was elected to the Wyoming House of Representatives at age 24, the youngest woman to serve in the state legislature. She was reelected in 1980, but chose to not seek reelection in 1982. Lummis returned to the state house after winning the 1984 election. She filed to run for reelection on June 19, 1986, and was reelected after placing third out of 18 candidates. She was reelected in the 1988 and 1990 elections. She was reapportioned to the 8th district in 1992.

In 1990, when Republican Senator Dan Sullivan resigned from the Wyoming Senate, Senate Majority Leader Diemer True stated that Lummis was qualified to replace Sullivan in the state senate. But she could not take the position, as she was busy serving as a campaign manager in the gubernatorial election. In 1992, Lummis ran for a seat in the Wyoming Senate from the 5th district, defeating Norman P. Feagler for the Republican nomination, and incumbent Democratic Senator Harriet Elizabeth Byrd in the general election. During the campaign Lummis spent $11,661, making her the fifth-highest spending elected candidate in the 1992 election. On June 8, 1994, she announced that she would not run for reelection, saying she had other commitments to her family. Republican nominee Don Lawler was elected to succeed her after defeating Democratic nominee Steve Freudenthal.

Tenure

During Lummis's tenure in the state house, she chaired the Revenue committee and served on the Judiciary and Agriculture Committees. During her tenure in the state senate she served on the Judiciary Committee. After leaving the state legislature, she was appointed to Jim Geringer's gubernatorial transition team, and served as his general counsel until 1997. Geringer appointed Lummis to serve as interim director of the Office of State Lands and Investments in 1997, after he fired Jim Magagna.

On February 28, 1982, Lummis was injured in a car accident while Wiederspahn was driving. She attended the National Conference of State Legislatures national conference in 1982, alongside Senate President Donald Cundall and Representatives Wiederspahn, Peg Shreve, Scott Ratliff, William A. Cross, and George Salisbury. In a 1982 roll-call vote in favor of legislation about the treatment of non-resident traffic offenders, a man cast Lummis's vote while she was outside the room. Lummis changed the vote to a nay after coming back in, and Representative Ken Burns cited this as an example of why electronic voting was needed.

During the 1988 Republican presidential primaries, Lummis served on Bob Dole's steering committee in Wyoming. A 1989 survey of the financial contributors of the Wyoming Republican Party showed that Lummis was suggested as a candidate for Secretary of State of Wyoming. She served as Republican candidate Mary Mead's campaign manager during the 1990 gubernatorial election.

Treasurer

Elections

On November 17, 1996, incumbent Treasurer Stan Smith announced that he would not seek reelection to a fifth term in 1998. It was speculated that Lummis would replace him. At the Laramie County Republican convention on March 28, 1998, she announced that she would run for treasurer, and formally announced her campaign on April 20, at a press conference alongside Smith.

During the campaign, the Attorney General ruled that public funds could not be used to send state treasurer candidates to an investment seminar. Lummis won the Republican nomination without opposition and defeated Democratic nominee Charyl Loveridge and Libertarian nominee James Blomquist.

Lummis was considered as a possible candidate for the Republican nomination in the 2002 gubernatorial election, but declined to run. She announced on April 30 that she would seek reelection as treasurer, and was reelected without opposition in 2002. Lummis was the only statewide candidate to face no opposition in the 2002 election, as nobody had filed to run in the Democratic primary and no other candidate received the 25 write-in votes required to qualify for the nomination. During the campaign she had raised $9,275 and spent $12,151.

She was limited to two terms as treasurer and did not challenge the constitutionality of the legislation, despite the Wyoming Supreme Court having invalidated term limits on state legislators. She endorsed former Speaker Fred Parady to succeed her as treasurer in the 2006 election, but Joseph Meyer won the Republican primary and the general election.

Tenure

Lummis conducted an accounting change by raising the interest rate on the $100 million in Wyoming banks, which reduced Wyoming's expected budget deficit in 1999 by over $5 million. She also planned a 1% increase on the interest yield of Wyoming's $2.6 billion permanent fund, which would raise $26 million per year. She served on the Wyoming Board of Land Commissioners alongside Governor Geringer, Secretary of State Meyer, Auditor Max Maxfield, and superintendent of public instruction Judy Catchpole. During her tenure, the Permanent Mineral Trust Fund rose to over $2 billion for the first time.

In April 2001, Lummis announced a conflict of interest involving her role as treasurer of the Arp and Hammond Hardware Company, which she claimed had existed since December 2000 but had existed since April 2000. She and other Republican statewide officials were accused of trying to expand their powers at the expense of Governor Dave Freudenthal, but denied the claims. Lummis claimed that she was the person responsible for the increase in Wyoming's investments during her tenure as treasurer, but Freudenthal said that no one person could take credit for the increase.

As a member of the Wyoming Canvassing Board, Lummis voted unanimously alongside the three other members against a recall of the ballots cast in Natrona County during the 2002 United States House of Representatives election. Even though the results in Natrona County could not overturn the statewide results, they would determine which county was placed first on the ballot. Lummis initially supported a recount, but changed her mind after Mary Ann Collins, the Natrona County Clerk, told her that all of the ballots had been counted.

Lummis and all other statewide officials in Wyoming attended the first inauguration of George W. Bush. During the 2004 presidential election, she served as one of Wyoming's 28 delegates to the Republican National Convention. Lummis was the only statewide official from Wyoming to attended Bush's second inauguration. She served as the chair of Ray Hunkins's campaign during the 2006 gubernatorial election.

United States House of Representatives

Elections

Representative Barbara Cubin, whom Lummis had supported during the 1994 election, announced that she would not run for reelection in the 2008 election. On January 2, 2008, Lummis announced that she would run for Cubin's seat, winning the Republican nomination against Mark Gordon, Bill Winney, and Michael Holland, having challenged them to debates held in all 23 Wyoming counties during the primaries. A poll conducted from January 18 to 21 showed that Lummis had a favorability rating of 29%, unfavorability rating of 17%, a neutral rating of 24%, and 30% did not recognize her. Tucker Fagan, who later served as her chief of staff, served as Lummis's campaign manager. During the campaign Rachael Seidenschnur, her press secretary, resigned after using a fake name to ask Lummis's opponent a question. She defeated Democratic nominee Gary Trauner in the general election. During the campaign Lummis raised $1,557,313 and spent $1,543,875 while Trauner raised $1,672,707 and spent $1,716,013.

Lummis was reelected in 2010 against Democratic nominee David Wendt and Libertarian nominee John V. Love, after having raised $780,426 and spending $754,270 compared to Wendt, who had raised $65,709 and spent $68,523 Lummis announced that she would run for reelection on May 21, 2012, and was reelected in the 2012 election over Democratic nominee Chris Henrichsen after having raised $715,314 and spent $631,026. She was reelected in the 2014 election against Democratic nominee Richard Grayson after having raised $432,666 and spent $300,949.

On November 12, 2015, Lummis announced that she would not seek reelection in the 2016 election, and Liz Cheney was elected to succeed her. Lummis's daughter, Annaliese Wiederspahn, served as Leland Christensen's campaign manager during the Republican primary. Lummis considered running for the Republican nomination in the 2018 gubernatorial election, but declined to run and endorsed Sam Galeotos. She sought a position in President Donald Trump's cabinet by attempting to replace Ryan Zinke as United States Secretary of the Interior, but David Bernhardt was appointed instead.

Tenure

During Lummis's tenure in the House, she served on the Agriculture and Appropriations Committees and on the Energy and Mineral Resources, National Parks, Forests and Public Lands, and Energy and Water Development Subcommittees. She was the first representative from Wyoming to serve on the Agriculture Committee since Frank O. Horton, who served on the committee from 1939 to 1941. In 2011, she was appointed vice chair of the Appropriations Subcommittee of the Agriculture Committee. Lummis left the Appropriations Committee in 2013, saying she had requested her removal from the committee and that it was not part of a purge of radical Republicans from committee positions. She was appointed chair of the Science Subcommittee on Energy in 2013.

Lummis served as the communications chair and spokesperson of the Congressional Western Caucus and succeeded Dean Heller as vice chair in 2011 following Heller's appointment to the United States Senate. Lummis was elected to serve on the House Republican Steering Committee in 2010. She was at one point the only female member of the Freedom Caucus and the last until the election of Debbie Lesko. Lummis co-chaired the Congressional Caucus for Women's Issues alongside Representative Gwen Moore from 2011 to 2013. She was also a member of the Tea Party Caucus.

Lummis supported Speaker John Boehner while the Freedom Caucus successfully pushed to remove Boehner. She praised the election of Paul Ryan as Speaker, saying, "we have ushered in thoughtful, conservative leadership, restored member-driven policy-making to the legislative process and returned regular order that will bring sunshine to back rooms making government work better".

Lummis served on the Republican whip team until she was removed from the position in 2015, for voting against giving President Barack Obama the authority to propose a trade agreement with Pacific countries. She said she knew she would be removed from her position on the whip team for her vote but did not regret it. Representatives Steve Pearce and Trent Franks were also removed from the whip team for their votes.

During the 2008 presidential election, Lummis was supposed to give a speech at the Republican National Convention on the first day, but her speech was canceled due to Hurricane Gustav. During the 2012 Republican presidential primaries she endorsed Mitt Romney and served as the chair of Romney's campaign in Wyoming. During the 2016 Republican presidential primaries, she was a campaign surrogate for Rand Paul, and later endorsed Trump in the  presidential election.

United States Senate

Elections

After Senator Craig L. Thomas died on June 4, 2007, Lummis announced on June 12 that she would seek an appointment to replace him. She placed third in the final vote, making her one of the nominees submitted to the governor as a candidate for appointment, alongside John Barrasso and Tom Sansonetti. Freudenthal selected Barrasso to replace Thomas. Lummis was speculated as a possible candidate in the 2014 United States Senate election.

On June 20, 2019, Lummis filed to run for a seat in the United States Senate to succeed retiring Senator Mike Enzi. She won the Republican nomination and defeated Democratic nominee Merav Ben-David in the general election. Her victory made her the first woman to represent Wyoming in the United States Senate. She raised more during the campaign than all of her Republican and Democratic opponents combined. During the campaign Lummis raised $3,003,788 and spent $3,037,813 while Ben-David raised $559,626 and spent $545,348.

Tenure

During her tenure in the Senate, Lummis has served on the Banking, Housing, and Urban Affairs, Environment and Public Works, and Commerce, Science, and Transportation Committees. Hans Hunt, a member of the Wyoming state house, resigned so that he could work as Lummis's agriculture and trade policy adviser.

During the counting of the electoral college vote of the 2020 presidential election Lummis voted to certify the results from Arizona, but against certifying the results from Pennsylvania. She voted to acquit Trump during his second impeachment trial.

Lummis voted against the American Rescue Plan Act of 2021 but for the PPP Extension Act and the COVID-19 Hate Crimes Act.

Political positions

Economy

Lummis supported the federal takeover of Fannie Mae and Freddie Mac, but said the government should avoid bailing out private companies. She supported the privization of Social Security, raising the age at which people received Social Security money, and making the Bush tax cuts permanent. She voted against the American Recovery and Reinvestment Act of 2009.

In 2010, the House voted 228 to 192, with Lummis in favor, to prohibit federal funding for NPR. She said that House Democrats had a "cocaine-like addiction" to spending. Lummis voted against the Hurricane Sandy relief bill, saying that although victims of Hurricane Sandy deserved the money the federal government should cut its budget to offset the cost of the legislation.

Lummis has campaigned for a regulatory framework for digital assets, a stance she reiterated after the FTX exchange collapsed.

Energy and climate change

In a 2012 campaign debate, Lummis rejected the  scientific consensus on climate change, claiming that climate change was "not settled science". She supports the development of nuclear power and oil drilling in Alaska.

Equality

In 1979, Lummis said that it was "important to me to see Equal Rights Amendment not rescinded". In 2015, she and Representative Carolyn Maloney led another effort to pass the ERA. In 2013, the House voted 286 to 138, with Lummis against, to reauthorize the Violence Against Women Act. She and Senator Chris Van Hollen attempted to have a federal building in Cheyenne named after Louisa Swain, the first woman to vote in the United States.

LGBT rights 
Lummis voted against the Matthew Shepard and James Byrd Jr. Hate Crimes Prevention Act, named after Matthew Shepard, who was murdered in an anti-gay hate crime, stating that she believed that hate crime legislation was "a state's rights issue". She voted against the repeal of don't ask, don't tell and co-sponsored the State Marriage Defense Act. Following the Supreme Court ruling in Obergefell v. Hodges, which found same-sex marriage bans unconstitutional, Lummis supported the First Amendment Defense Act to protect religious groups that opposed gay marriage. She opposes same-sex marriage and believes that it "should be left to the states". She was given a zero percent rating from the Human Rights Campaign during her entire tenure in the House of Representatives. She was one of 12 Republicans to vote to advance the Respect for Marriage Act, legislation that codifies same-sex marriage rights into federal law. On November 29, 2022, Lummis voted for the final passage of the Respect for Marriage Act. Explaining her decision, reversing her prior opposition to federal same-sex marriage recognition, she said she was "guided by two things—the Wyoming Constitution and ensuring religious liberties for all citizens and faith-based organizations were protected."

Foreign policy

Lummis supported continuing the United States' occupation of Iraq, holding that soldiers should not be withdrawn until General David Petraeus said it was time to leave. She supported the surge of soldiers in Iraq. Lummis was one of four Republicans on the Agriculture Committee to vote in favor of legislation that would have lifted the travel ban on Americans and agricultural products to and from Cuba. Lummis opposed American involvement in the Syrian civil war, stating that the civil war "should be dealt with by the Arab world" and that she did not see how "getting involved in another open-ended and costly conflict is in the best interest of America".

Firearms

Lummis received an A rating from the National Rifle Association during the 2008 campaign. In 2009, the House voted 279 to 147, with Lummis in favor, to allow people to bring loaded guns into national parks and wildlife refuges.

Health care legislation

Lummis supported the creation of federal legislation to allow private insurance companies to form interstate insurance pools. She voted against passage of the Affordable Care Act in 2009, and has supported subsequent efforts to defund the ACA.

Lummis and 182 other Republican members of Congress filed an amicus brief asking the Supreme Court to halt a COVID-19 vaccination mandate for companies with 100 or more employees. During the COVID-19 pandemic, she opposed adding unruly passengers to the "no-fly" list, saying that unruly passengers who refuse to comply with mask requirements are not the same as terrorists.

Lummis co-sponsored legislation in the state house to allow state Medicaid funding to be used for abortions when the mother's life was at risk. The Wyoming "Right to Choose" political action committee reported that Lummis was pro-choice after she completed a questionnaire during the 1990 election and the organization endorsed her during the 1992 election. Lummis said in the 1990s that abortion was a sin, but that it should not be illegal, because people can better evaluate their circumstances than the state.

In 2015, Lummis cosponsored and voted for legislation in the House to defund Planned Parenthood. The National Right to Life Committee endorsed her in the 2020 election and gave her a 100% anti-abortion rating during her tenure in the U.S. House of Representatives. She supported the Pain-Capable Unborn Child Protection Act. Lummis was given a 0% rating by NARAL Pro-Choice America in 2016.

Personal life

Lummis met Alvin Wiederspahn while both were campaigning during the 1978 election; they married on May 28, 1983. Both later served in the Wyoming House of Representatives, one of the few married couples to do so, though Lummis was a Republican and Wiederspahn a Democrat. She remained married to Wiederspahn, with whom she had one child, until his death on October 24, 2014.

Lummis has a net worth of $12.26 million as of 2015, but reported a net worth between $20 million and $75 million from 2007 to 2008. She purchased Bitcoin in 2013 on her son-in-law's advice and became the first U.S. senator to own cryptocurrency. Lummis owns at least $230,000 worth of Bitcoin as of 2021. She is a Lutheran and adheres to the Lutheran Church–Missouri Synod (LCMS).

Electoral history

See also
 Women in the United States House of Representatives
 Women in the United States Senate

References

External links

2008 campaign website
Cynthis M. Lummis papers at the University of Wyoming – American Heritage Center

|-

|-

|-

|-

 

1954 births
20th-century American lawyers
20th-century American politicians
20th-century American women politicians
21st-century American politicians
21st-century American women politicians
American Lutherans
American people of German descent
Christians from Wyoming
Female members of the United States House of Representatives
Female United States senators
Living people
Lutheran Church–Missouri Synod people
Republican Party members of the Wyoming House of Representatives
Politicians from Cheyenne, Wyoming
Protestants from Wyoming
Ranchers from Wyoming
Republican Party members of the United States House of Representatives from Wyoming
Republican Party United States senators from Wyoming
State treasurers of Wyoming
University of Wyoming alumni
Women state legislators in Wyoming
Wyoming lawyers
Republican Party Wyoming state senators